Greater São Paulo is a nonspecific term for one of the multiple definitions of the large metropolitan area located in the São Paulo state in Brazil.

Definitions

Metropolitan Area
A legally defined specific term, Região Metropolitana de São Paulo (RMSP), one definition for Metropolitan São Paulo, consists of 39 municipalities, including the state capital, São Paulo.

The RMSP of São Paulo is known as a financial and economic centre of Brazil, with a total population of 23,455,256 inhabitants (2017 estimate). The largest municipalities are São Paulo, with a population of 12,138,175, Guarulhos with a population of 1,337,087 people, plus several municipalities with more than 500,000 inhabitants, such as São Bernardo do Campo (822,242 inh.) and Santo André (712,749 inh.) in the ABC Region. The ABC Region (from Santo André, São Bernardo do Campo and São Caetano do Sul) in the south of Grande São Paulo is an important location for industrial corporations, such as Volkswagen and Ford.  It represents the "core" cities of the greater region.

Extended Metropolitan Area

The extended metropolitan area of São Paulo (Complexo Metropolitano Estendido de São Paulo) is an agglomeration of five contiguous metropolitan areas that have grown into one another and three microregions, dominated by São Paulo. It has more than 33 million inhabitants, which is 75% of the population of the entire state of São Paulo, and consists of the contiguous entities:

RMSP statistics

 Territorial area: 7,947 km2
 Urban area: 2,139 km2
 Population: 23,455,256
 GDP: R$ 1,140 trillion
 Latitude: 23 533S
 Longitude: 46 617W

Municipalities in RMSP

1,000,000+

São Paulo (12,138,175)
Guarulhos (1,337,087)

500,000–999,999

São Bernardo do Campo (822,242)
Santo André (712,749)
Osasco (696,382)

200,000–499,999

Mauá (457,696)
Mogi das Cruzes (429,321)
Diadema (415,180)
Carapicuíba (394,256)
Itaquaquecetuba (356,774)
Suzano (288,056)
Taboão da Serra (275,948)
Barueri (264,935)
Embu das Artes (264,448)
Cotia (233,696)
Itapevi (226,488)

100,000–199,999

Ferraz de Vasconcelos (176,000)
Itapecerica da Serra (159,000)
Francisco Morato (155,000)
São Caetano do Sul (151,000)
Franco da Rocha (129,000)
Poá (112,481)
Ribeirão Pires (112,020)
Santana de Parnaíba (111,000)
Jandira (110,000)

Under 100,000

Caieiras (87,000)
Arujá (79,000)
Mairiporã (77,000)
Cajamar (63,000)
Embu-Guaçu (62,000)
Santa Isabel (47,000)
Vargem Grande Paulista (44,000)
Rio Grande da Serra (41,000)
Biritiba-Mirim (29,000)
Juquitiba (29,000)
Guararema (27,000)
São Lourenço da Serra (18,000)
Salesópolis (16,000)
Pirapora do Bom Jesus (15,000)

Transport

Being the most industrialized region of the country as well as the most populated, the transportation plays an important role. The main highways (rodovias) of the area are:

 Rodovia Anhanguera
 Rodovia dos Imigrantes
 Rodovia Anchieta
 Rodovia dos Bandeirantes
 Rodovia Presidente Dutra
 Rodovia Ayrton Senna
 Rodovia Castelo Branco
 Rodovia Fernão Dias
 Rodovia Raposo Tavares
 Rodovia Régis Bittencourt
 Rodoanel Mário Covas

The São Paulo Metro and the Companhia Paulista de Trens Metropolitanos provide rail-based transit within the metropolitan area.

Notes and references

External links 

 Map

Metropolitan areas of São Paulo